The Barth Hotel, also known as the Union Warehouse, is located in Denver, Colorado.  It was built in 1882 and was added to the National Register of Historic Places in 1982.  In 1980, it was the oldest continuously operated hotel in Denver.

It has also been known as the Union Hotel, the New Union Hotel, the Elk Hotel, and the New Elk Hotel.

It is a four-story building with a  plan, designed by Denver architect F.C. Eberley. Originally the hotel occupied the top three floors;  only later was a hotel lobby was added in the first floor.

References

Hotels in Colorado
Commercial buildings on the National Register of Historic Places in Colorado
Commercial buildings completed in 1882
National Register of Historic Places in Denver